Bruce Springsteen (born 1949) is an American singer and songwriter.

Springsteen may also refer to:
 Devo Springsteen (born 1977), American record producer and songwriter
 Jay Springsteen (born 1957), member of the Motorcycle Hall of Fame
 Jessica Springsteen (born 1991), American show jumping rider, daughter of Bruce Springsteen
 Pamela Springsteen (born 1962), American photographer and actress, sister of Bruce Springsteen
 Robert G. Springsteen (1907–1989), American film director
 "Springsteen" (song), a 2012 single by American country music artist Eric Church
 23990 Springsteen, an asteroid.

See also
 Springstein, Manitoba, a community in Canada